Family Life is a 1985 French film by Jacques Doillon.

External links
 

1985 films
French drama films
1980s French-language films
Films directed by Jacques Doillon
1980s French films
1985 drama films